Çukurören is a village in the Suluova District, Amasya Province, Turkey. Its population is 65 (2021).

One of Turkey's largest dams is being built in the Çukurören region.

References

Villages in Suluova District